

Events

Pre-1600
1457 BC – Battle of Megido - the first battle to have been recorded in what is accepted as relatively reliable detail.
69 – Defeated by Vitellius' troops at Bedriacum, Otho commits suicide. 
73 – Masada, a Jewish fortress, falls to the Romans after several months of siege, ending the First Jewish–Roman War.
1346 – Stefan Dušan, "the Mighty", is crowned Emperor of the Serbs at Skopje, his empire occupying much of the Balkans.
1520 – The Revolt of the Comuneros begins in Spain against the rule of Charles V.
1582 – Spanish conquistador Hernando de Lerma founds the settlement of Salta, Argentina.

1601–1900
1746 – The Battle of Culloden is fought between the French-supported Jacobites and the British Hanoverian forces commanded by William Augustus, Duke of Cumberland, in Scotland. After the battle many highland traditions were banned and the Highlands of Scotland were cleared of inhabitants.
1780 – Franz Friedrich Wilhelm von Fürstenberg founds the University of Münster.
1799 – French Revolutionary Wars: The Battle of Mount Tabor: Napoleon drives Ottoman Turks across the River Jordan near Acre.
1818 – The United States Senate ratifies the Rush–Bagot Treaty, limiting naval armaments on the Great Lakes and Lake Champlain.
  1838   – The French Army captures Veracruz in the Pastry War.
1847 – Shooting of a Māori by an English sailor results in the opening of the Wanganui Campaign of the New Zealand Wars.
1853 – The Great Indian Peninsula Railway opens the first passenger rail in India, from Bori Bunder to Thane.
1858 – The Wernerian Natural History Society, a former Scottish learned society, is dissolved.
1862 – American Civil War: Battle at Lee's Mills in Virginia.
  1862   – American Civil War: The District of Columbia Compensated Emancipation Act, a bill ending slavery in the District of Columbia, becomes law.
1863 – American Civil War: During the Vicksburg Campaign, gunboats commanded by acting Rear Admiral David Dixon Porter run downriver past Confederate artillery batteries at Vicksburg.
1878 – The Senate of the Grand Duchy of Finland issued a declaration establishing a city of Kotka on the southern part islands from the old Kymi parish.
1881 – In Dodge City, Kansas, Bat Masterson fights his last gun battle.

1901–present
1908 – Natural Bridges National Monument is established in Utah.
1910 – The oldest existing indoor ice hockey arena still used for the sport in the 21st century, Boston Arena, opens for the first time. 
1912 – Harriet Quimby becomes the first woman to fly an airplane across the English Channel.
1917 – Russian Revolution: Vladimir Lenin returns to Petrograd, Russia, from exile in Switzerland.
1919 – Mohandas Gandhi organizes a day of "prayer and fasting" in response to the killing of Indian protesters in the Jallianwala Bagh massacre by the British colonial troops three days earlier.
  1919   – Polish–Lithuanian War: The Polish Army launches the Vilna offensive to capture Vilnius in modern Lithuania.
1922 – The Treaty of Rapallo, pursuant to which Germany and the Soviet Union re-establish diplomatic relations, is signed.
1925 – During the Communist St Nedelya Church assault in Sofia, Bulgaria, 150 are killed and 500 are wounded.
1941 – World War II: The Italian-German Tarigo convoy is attacked and destroyed by British ships.
  1941   – World War II: The Nazi-affiliated Ustaše is put in charge of the Independent State of Croatia by the Axis powers after Operation 25 is effected.
1942 – King George VI awarded the George Cross to the people of Malta in appreciation of their heroism.
1943 – Albert Hofmann accidentally discovers the hallucinogenic effects of the research drug LSD. He intentionally takes the drug three days later on April 19.
1944 – World War II: Allied forces start bombing Belgrade, killing about 1,100 people. This bombing fell on the Orthodox Christian Easter.
1945 – World War II: The Red Army begins the final assault on German forces around Berlin, with nearly one million troops fighting in the Battle of the Seelow Heights.
  1945   – The United States Army liberates Nazi Sonderlager (high security) prisoner-of-war camp Oflag IV-C (better known as Colditz).
  1945   – More than 7,000 die when the German transport ship Goya is sunk by a Soviet submarine.
1947 – An explosion on board a freighter in port causes the city of Texas City, Texas, to catch fire, killing almost 600.
  1947   – Bernard Baruch first applies the term "Cold War" to describe the relationship between the United States and the Soviet Union.
1948 – The Organization of European Economic Co-operation is formed.
1961 – In a nationally broadcast speech, Cuban leader Fidel Castro declares that he is a Marxist–Leninist and that Cuba is going to adopt Communism.
1963 – Dr. Martin Luther King Jr. pens his Letter from Birmingham Jail while incarcerated in Birmingham, Alabama for protesting against segregation.
1972 – Apollo program: The launch of Apollo 16 from Cape Canaveral, Florida.
1990 – "Doctor Death", Jack Kevorkian, participates in his first assisted suicide.
1996 – Israel strikes a civilian house in Nabatieh Fawka, Lebanon, killing nine people, including seven children.
2001 – India and Bangladesh begin a five-day border conflict, but are unable to resolve the disputes about their border.
2003 – The Treaty of Accession is signed in Athens admitting ten new member states to the European Union.
  2003   – Michael Jordan plays his final game with the National Basketball Association. 
2007 – Virginia Tech shooting: Seung-Hui Cho guns down 32 people and injures 17 before committing suicide.
2008 – The U.S. Supreme Court rules in the Baze v. Rees decision that execution by lethal injection does not violate the Eighth Amendment ban against cruel and unusual punishment.
2012 – The trial for Anders Behring Breivik, the perpetrator of the 2011 Norway attacks, begins in Oslo, Norway.
  2012   – The Pulitzer Prize winners were announced, it was the first time since 1977 that no book won the Fiction Prize.
2013 – A 7.8-magnitude earthquake strikes Sistan and Baluchestan Province, Iran, killing at least 35 people and injuring 117 others.
  2013   – The 2013 Baga massacre is started when Boko Haram militants engage government soldiers in Baga.
2014 – The South Korean ferry MV Sewol capsizes and sinks near Jindo Island, killing 304 passengers and crew and leading to widespread criticism of the South Korean government, media, and shipping authorities.
2016 – Ecuador's worst earthquake in nearly 40 years kills 676 and injures 6,274.
2018 – The New York Times and the New Yorker win the Pulitzer Prize for Public Service for breaking news of the Harvey Weinstein sexual abuse scandal.

Births

Pre-1600
1488 – Jungjong of Joseon (d. 1544)
1495 – Petrus Apianus, German mathematician and astronomer (d. 1557)
1516 – Tabinshwehti, Burmese king (d. 1550)
1569 – John Davies, English poet and lawyer (d. 1626)

1601–1900
1635 – Frans van Mieris the Elder, Dutch painter (d. 1681)
1646 – Jules Hardouin-Mansart, French architect, designed the Château de Dampierre and Grand Trianon (probable; d. 1708)
1660 – Hans Sloane, Irish-English physician and academic (d. 1753)
1661 – Charles Montagu, 1st Earl of Halifax, English poet and politician, First Lord of the Treasury (d. 1715)
1682 – John Hadley, English mathematician, invented the octant (d. 1744)
1697 – Johann Gottlieb Görner, German organist and composer (d. 1778)
1728 – Joseph Black, French-Scottish physician and chemist (d. 1799)
1730 – Henry Clinton, English general and politician (d. 1795)
1755 – Louise Élisabeth Vigée Le Brun, French painter (d. 1842)
1786 – John Franklin, English admiral and politician, fourth Lieutenant Governor of Van Diemen's Land (d. 1847)
1800 – George Bingham, 3rd Earl of Lucan, English field marshal and politician (d. 1888)
1808 – Caleb Blood Smith, American journalist, lawyer, and politician, sixth United States Secretary of the Interior (d. 1864)
1821 – Ford Madox Brown, French-English soldier and painter (d. 1893)
1823 – Gotthold Eisenstein, German mathematician and academic (d. 1852)
1826 – Sir James Corry, 1st Baronet, British politician (d. 1891)
1827 – Octave Crémazie, Canadian poet and bookseller (d. 1879)
1839 – Antonio Starabba, Marchese di Rudinì, Italian politician, 12th Prime Minister of Italy (d. 1908)
1834 – Charles Lennox Richardson, English merchant (d. 1862)
1844 – Anatole France, French journalist, novelist, and poet, Nobel Prize laureate (d. 1924)
1847 – Hans Auer, Swiss-Austrian architect, designed the Federal Palace of Switzerland (d. 1906)
1848 – Kandukuri Veeresalingam, Indian author and activist (d. 1919)
1851 – Ponnambalam Ramanathan, Sri Lankan lawyer and politician, third Solicitor General of Sri Lanka (d. 1930)
1864 – Rose Talbot Bullard, American medical doctor and professor (d. 1915)
1865 – Harry Chauvel, Australian general (d. 1945)
1866 – José de Diego, Puerto Rican journalist, lawyer, and politician (d. 1918)
1867 – Wilbur Wright, American inventor (d. 1912)
1871 – John Millington Synge, Irish author, poet, and playwright (d. 1909)
1874 – Jōtarō Watanabe, Japanese general (d. 1936)
1878 – R. E. Foster, English cricketer and footballer (d. 1914)
1882 – Seth Bingham, American organist and composer (d. 1972)
1884 – Ronald Barnes, 3rd Baron Gorell, English cricketer, journalist, and politician (d. 1963)
1885 – Leó Weiner, Hungarian composer and educator (d. 1960)
1886 – Michalis Dorizas, Greek-American football player and javelin thrower (d. 1957)
  1886   – Ernst Thälmann, German politician (d. 1944)
1888 – Billy Minter, English footballer and manager (d. 1940)
1889 – Charlie Chaplin, English actor, director, producer, screenwriter, and composer (d. 1977)
1890 – Fred Root, English cricketer and umpire (d. 1954)
  1890   – Gertrude Chandler Warner, American author and educator (d. 1979)
1891 – Dorothy P. Lathrop, American author and illustrator (d. 1980)
1892 – Howard Mumford Jones, American author, critic, and academic (d. 1980)
1893 – Germaine Guèvremont, Canadian journalist and author (d. 1968)
  1893   – John Norton, American hurdler (d. 1979)
1895 – Ove Arup, English-Danish engineer and businessman, founded Arup (d. 1988)
1896 – Robert Henry Best, American journalist (d. 1952)
  1896   – Árpád Weisz, Hungarian footballer (d. 1944)
1899 – Osman Achmatowicz, Polish chemist and academic (d. 1988)
1900 – Polly Adler, Russian-American madam and author (d. 1962)

1901–present
1903 – Paul Waner, American baseball player and manager (d. 1965)
1904 – Fifi D'Orsay, Canadian-American vaudevillian, actress, and singer (d. 1983)
1905 – Frits Philips, Dutch businessman (d. 2005)
1907 – Joseph-Armand Bombardier, Canadian inventor and businessman, founded Bombardier Inc. (d. 1964)
  1907   – August Eigruber, Austrian-German politician (d. 1947)
1908 – Ellis Marsalis, Sr., American businessman and activist (d. 2004)
  1908   – Ray Ventura, French jazz bandleader (d. 1979)
1910 – Berton Roueché, American journalist and author (d. 1994)
1911 – Guy Burgess, English-Russian spy (d. 1963)
1913 – Les Tremayne, English actor (d. 2003)
1914 – John Hodiak, American actor (d. 1955) 
  1915   – Robert Speck, Canadian politician, first Mayor of Mississauga (d. 1972)
1916 – Behçet Necatigil, Turkish author, poet, and translator (d. 1979)
1917 – Victoria Eugenia Fernández de Córdoba, 18th Duchess of Medinaceli (d. 2013)
  1917   – Barry Nelson, American actor (d. 2007)
1918 – Dick Gibson, English racing driver (d. 2010)
  1918   – Hsuan Hua, Chinese-American monk and author (d. 1995)
  1918   – Juozas Kazickas, Lithuanian-American businessman and philanthropist (d. 2014)
  1918   – Spike Milligan, Irish actor, comedian, and writer (d. 2002)
1919 – Merce Cunningham, American dancer and choreographer (d. 2009)
  1919   – Nilla Pizzi, Italian singer (d. 2011)
  1919   – Pedro Ramírez Vázquez, Mexican architect, designed the Tijuana Cultural Center and National Museum of Anthropology (d. 2013)
  1919   – Thomas Willmore, English geometer and academic (d. 2005)
1920 – Ananda Dassanayake, Sri Lankan politician (d. 2012)
  1920   – Prince George Valdemar of Denmark (d. 1986)
1921 – Arlin Adams, American lawyer and judge (d. 2015)
  1921   – Wolfgang Leonhard, German historian and author (d. 2014)
  1921   – Peter Ustinov, English actor, director, producer, and screenwriter (d. 2004)
1922 – Kingsley Amis, English novelist, poet, and critic (d. 1995)
  1922   – John Christopher, English author (d. 2012)
  1922   – Lawrence N. Guarino, American colonel (d. 2014)
  1922   – Leo Tindemans, Belgian politician, 43rd Prime Minister of Belgium (d. 2014)
1923 – Warren Barker, American composer (d. 2006)
  1923   – Arch A. Moore Jr., American sergeant, lawyer, and politician, 28th Governor of West Virginia (d. 2015)
1924 – John Harvey-Jones, English academic and businessman (d. 2008)
  1924   – Henry Mancini, American composer and conductor (d. 1994)
  1924   – Rudy Pompilli, American saxophonist (d. 1976)
  1924   – Madanjeet Singh, Indian diplomat, author, and philanthropist (d. 2013)
1926 – Pierre Fabre, French pharmacist, founded Laboratoires Pierre Fabre (d. 2013)
1927 – Edie Adams, American actress and singer (d. 2008)
  1927   – Pope Benedict XVI  (d. 2022)
  1927   – Rolf Schult, German actor (d. 2013)
1929 – Roy Hamilton, American singer (d. 1969)
  1929   – Ralph Slatyer, Australian biologist and ecologist (d. 2012)
  1929   – Ed Townsend, American singer-songwriter and producer (d. 2003)
1930 – Doug Beasy, Australian footballer and educator (d. 2013)
  1930   – Herbie Mann, American flute player and composer (d. 2003)
1932 – Maury Meyers, American lawyer and politician (d. 2014)
1933 – Marcos Alonso Imaz, Spanish footballer (d. 2012)
  1933   – Joan Bakewell, English journalist and author
  1933   – Perry Botkin Jr., American composer, arranger and musician (d. 2021)
  1933   – Vera Krepkina, Russian long jumper
  1933   – Ike Pappas, American journalist and actor (d. 2008)
1934 – Vince Hill, English singer-songwriter
  1934   – Robert Stigwood, Australian producer and manager (d. 2016)
  1934   – Barrie Unsworth, Australian politician, 36th Premier of New South Wales
  1934   – Vicar, Chilean cartoonist (d. 2012)
1935 – Marcel Carrière, Canadian director and screenwriter
  1935   – Sarah Kirsch, German poet and author (d. 2013)  
  1935   – Lennart Risberg, Swedish boxer (d. 2013)
  1935   – Dominique Venner, French journalist and historian (d. 2013)
  1935   – Bobby Vinton, American singer
1936 – Vadim Kuzmin, Russian physicist and academic (d. 2015)
  1937   – Gert Potgieter, South African hurdler and coach
1938 – Rich Rollins, American baseball player
  1938   – Gordon Wilson, Scottish lawyer and politician (d. 2017)
1939 – John Amabile, American football player and coach (d. 2012)
  1939   – Dusty Springfield, English singer and record producer (d. 1999)
1940 – Benoît Bouchard, Canadian academic and politician, 18th Canadian Minister of Transport
  1940   – David Holford, Barbadian cricketer
  1940   – Queen Margrethe II of Denmark
  1940   – Joan Snyder, American painter
  1940   – Thomas Stonor, 7th Baron Camoys, English banker and politician, Lord Chamberlain of the United Kingdom
1941 – Allan Segal, American director and producer (d. 2012)
1942 – Jim Lonborg, American baseball pitcher
  1942   – Sir Frank Williams, English businessman, founded the Williams F1 Racing Team (d. 2021)
1943 – Lonesome Dave Peverett, English singer-songwriter and guitarist (d. 2000)
  1943   – Petro Tyschtschenko, Austrian-German businessman
  1943   – John Watkins, Australian cricketer
1945 – Tom Allen, American lawyer and politician
1946 – Margot Adler, American journalist and author (d. 2014)
  1946   – Ernst Bakker, Dutch politician (d. 2014)
  1946   – Johnnie Lewis, Liberian lawyer and politician, 18th Chief Justice of Liberia (d. 2015)
  1946   – R. Carlos Nakai, American flute player
1947 – Kareem Abdul-Jabbar, American basketball player and coach
  1947   – Gerry Rafferty, Scottish singer-songwriter (d. 2011)
1948 – Reg Alcock, Canadian businessman and politician, 17th Canadian President of the Treasury Board (d. 2011)
1950 – David Graf, American actor (d. 2001)
  1950   – Colleen Hewett, Australian singer and actress
1951 – Ioan Mihai Cochinescu, Romanian author and photographer
1952 – Bill Belichick, American football player and coach
  1952   – Michel Blanc, French actor and director
  1952   – Esther Roth-Shahamorov, Israeli sprinter and hurdler
  1952   – Billy West, American voice actor, singer-songwriter, and comedian
1953 – Peter Garrett, Australian singer-songwriter and politician
  1953   – Jay O. Sanders, American actor
1954 – Ellen Barkin, American actress 
  1954   – John Bowe, Australian racing driver
  1954   – Mike Zuke, Canadian ice hockey player
1955 – Bruce Bochy, American baseball player and manager
  1955   – Henri, Grand Duke of Luxembourg
1956 – David M. Brown, American captain, pilot, and astronaut (d. 2003)
  1956   – T Lavitz, American keyboard player, composer, and producer (d. 2010)
  1956   – Lise-Marie Morerod, Swiss skier
1957 – Patricia De Martelaere, Belgian philosopher, author, and academic (d. 2009)
1958 – Tim Flach, English photographer and director
  1958   – Ulf Wakenius, Swedish guitarist 
1959 – Alison Ramsay, English-Scottish field hockey player and lawyer
1960 – Wahab Akbar, Filipino politician (d. 2007)
  1960   – Rafael Benítez, Spanish footballer and manager
  1960   – Pierre Littbarski, German footballer and manager
1961 – Jarbom Gamlin, Indian lawyer and politician, seventh Chief Minister of Arunachal Pradesh (d. 2014)
  1961   – Linda Ruth Williams, British film studies academic
1962 – Anna Dello Russo, Italian journalist
  1962   – Douglas Elmendorf, American economist and politician
  1962   – Ian MacKaye, American singer-songwriter, guitarist, and producer 
1963 – Saleem Malik, Pakistani cricketer
  1963   – Jimmy Osmond, American singer
1964 – David Kohan, American screenwriter and producer
  1964   – Dave Pirner, American singer, songwriter and producer
  1964   – Esbjörn Svensson, Swedish pianist (d. 2008)
1965 – Yves-François Blanchet, Canadian politician
  1965   – Jon Cryer, American actor, director, producer, and screenwriter
  1965   – Martin Lawrence, American actor, director, producer, and screenwriter
1966 – Jarle Vespestad, Norwegian drummer 
1968 – Vickie Guerrero, American wrestler and manager
  1968   – Rüdiger Stenzel, German runner
1969 – Patrik Järbyn, Swedish skier
  1969   – Fernando Viña, American baseball player and sportscaster
1970 – Dero Goi, German singer-songwriter and drummer 
  1970   – Walt Williams, American basketball player
1971 – Cameron Blades, Australian rugby player
  1971   – Selena, American singer-songwriter, actress, and fashion designer  (d. 1995)
  1971   – Seigo Yamamoto, Japanese racing driver
  1971   – Natasha Zvereva, Belarusian tennis player
1972 – Conchita Martínez, Spanish-American tennis player
  1972   – Tracy K. Smith, American poet and educator
1973 – Akon, Senegalese-American singer, rapper and songwriter 
  1973   – Charlotta Sörenstam, Swedish golfer
  1973   – Teddy Cobeña, Spanish-Ecuadorian expressionist and representational sculptor  
1976 – Lukas Haas, American actor and musician 
  1976   – Kelli O'Hara, American actress and singer
1977 – Freddie Ljungberg, Swedish footballer
1979 – Christijan Albers, Dutch racing driver
  1979   – Lars Börgeling, German pole vaulter
  1979   – Daniel Browne, New Zealand rugby player
1981 – Anestis Agritis, Greek footballer
  1981   – Maya Dunietz, Israeli singer-songwriter and pianist
  1981   – Matthieu Proulx, Canadian football player
1982 – Gina Carano, American mixed martial artist and actress
  1982   – Boris Diaw, French basketball player
  1982   – Jonathan Vilma, American football player
1983 – Marié Digby, American singer-songwriter, guitarist, and actress
  1983   – Cat Osterman, American softball player
1984 – Teddy Blass, American composer and producer
  1984   – Claire Foy, English actress
  1984   – Tucker Fredricks, American speed skater
  1984   – Paweł Kieszek, Polish footballer
  1984   – Kerron Stewart, Jamaican sprinter
1985 – Luol Deng, Sudanese-English basketball player
  1985   – Brendon Leonard, New Zealand rugby player
  1985   – Taye Taiwo, Nigerian footballer
1986 – Shinji Okazaki, Japanese footballer
  1986   – Peter Regin, Danish ice hockey player
  1986   – Epke Zonderland, Dutch gymnast
1987 – Cenk Akyol, Turkish basketball player
  1987   – Aaron Lennon, English international footballer
1988 – Kyle Okposo, American ice hockey player
1990 – Reggie Jackson, American basketball player
  1990   – Vangelis Mantzaris, Greek basketball player
  1990   – Tony McQuay, American sprinter
1991 – Nolan Arenado, American baseball player
  1991   – Kim Kyung-jung, South Korean footballer
1993 – Chance the Rapper, American rapper
  1993   – Mirai Nagasu, Japanese-American figure skater
1996 – Anya Taylor-Joy, Argentine-British actress
1996 – Taylor Townsend, American tennis player
 2002 – Sadie Sink, American actress

Deaths

Pre-1600
AD 69 – Otho, Roman emperor (b. AD 32)
 665 – Fructuosus of Braga, French archbishop and saint
1090 – Sikelgaita, duchess of Apulia (b. c. 1040)
1113 – Sviatopolk II of Kiev (b. 1050)
1118 – Adelaide del Vasto, regent of Sicily, mother of Roger II of Sicily, queen of Baldwin I of Jerusalem
1198 – Frederick I, Duke of Austria (b. 1175)
1234 – Richard Marshal, 3rd Earl of Pembroke (b. 1191)
1375 – John Hastings, 2nd Earl of Pembroke, English nobleman and soldier (b. 1347)
1496 – Charles II, Duke of Savoy (b. 1489)
1587 – Anne Seymour, Duchess of Somerset (b. 1497)

1601–1900
1640 – Countess Charlotte Flandrina of Nassau (b. 1579)
1645 – Tobias Hume, Scottish soldier, viol player, and composer (b. 1569)
1687 – George Villiers, 2nd Duke of Buckingham, English poet and politician, Lord Lieutenant of the West Riding of Yorkshire (b. 1628)
1689 – Aphra Behn, English author and playwright (b. 1640)
1742 – Stefano Benedetto Pallavicino, Italian poet and translator (b. 1672)
1756 – Jacques Cassini, French astronomer (b. 1677)
1783 – Christian Mayer, Czech astronomer and educator (b. 1719)
1788 – Georges-Louis Leclerc, Comte de Buffon, French mathematician, cosmologist, and author (b. 1707)
1828 – Francisco Goya, Spanish-French painter and illustrator (b. 1746)
1846 – Domenico Dragonetti, Italian bassist and composer (b. 1763)
1850 – Marie Tussaud, French-English sculptor, founded the Madame Tussauds Wax Museum (b. 1761)
1859 – Alexis de Tocqueville, French historian and philosopher, French Minister of Foreign Affairs (b. 1805)
1879 – Bernadette Soubirous, French nun and saint (b. 1844)
1888 – Zygmunt Florenty Wróblewski, Polish physicist and chemist (b. 1845)
1899 – Emilio Jacinto, Filipino journalist and activist (b. 1875)

1901–present
1904 – Maximilian Kronberger, German poet and author (b. 1888)
  1904   – Samuel Smiles, Scottish-English author (b. 1812)
1914 – George William Hill, American astronomer and mathematician (b. 1838)
1915 – Nelson W. Aldrich, American businessman and politician (b. 1841)
1925 – Stefan Nerezov, Bulgarian general (b. 1867)
1928 – Henry Birks, Canadian businessman, founded Henry Birks and Sons (b. 1840)
  1928   – Roman Steinberg, Estonian wrestler (b. 1900)
1930 – José Carlos Mariátegui, Peruvian journalist, philosopher, and activist (b. 1894)
1935 – Panait Istrati, Romanian journalist and author (b. 1884)
1937 – Jay Johnson Morrow, American military engineer and politician, third Governor of the Panama Canal Zone (b. 1870)
1938 – Steve Bloomer, English footballer and manager (b. 1874)
1940 – Tony D'Arcy, Irish Republican hunger striker
1941 – Josiah Stamp, 1st Baron Stamp, English economist and civil servant (b. 1880)
1942 – Princess Alexandra of Saxe-Coburg and Gotha (b. 1878)
  1942   – Denis St. George Daly, Irish polo player (b. 1862)
1946 – Arthur Chevrolet, Swiss-American race car driver and engineer (b. 1884)
1947 – Rudolf Höss, German SS officer (b. 1900)
1950 – Eduard Oja, Estonian composer, conductor, and critic (b. 1905)
  1950   – Anders Peter Nielsen, Danish target shooter (b. 1867)
1955 – David Kirkwood, Scottish engineer and politician (b. 1872)
1958 – Rosalind Franklin, English biophysicist and academic (b. 1920)
1960 – Mihály Fekete, Hungarian actor, screenwriter and film director (b. 1884) 
1961 – Carl Hovland, American psychologist and academic (b. 1912)
1965 – Francis Balfour, English soldier and colonial administrator (b. 1884)
1965 – Sydney Chaplin, English actor, comedian, brother of Charlie Chaplin (b. 1885)
1966 – Eric Lambert, Australian author (b. 1918)
1968 – Fay Bainter, American actress (b. 1893)
  1968   – Edna Ferber, American novelist, short story writer, and playwright (b. 1885)
1969 – Hem Vejakorn, Thai illustrator and painter (b. 1904)
1970 – Richard Neutra, Austrian-American architect, designed the Los Angeles County Hall of Records (b. 1892)
  1970   – Péter Veres, Hungarian politician, Hungarian Minister of Defence (b. 1897)
1972 – Yasunari Kawabata, Japanese novelist and short story writer, Nobel Prize laureate (b. 1899)
  1972   – Frank O'Connor, Australian public servant (b. 1894)
1973 – István Kertész, Hungarian conductor and educator (b. 1929)
1978 – Lucius D. Clay, American officer and military governor in occupied Germany (b. 1898)
1980 – Morris Stoloff, American composer (b. 1898)
1985 – Scott Brady, American actor (b. 1924)
1988 – Khalil al-Wazir, Palestinian commander, founded Fatah (b. 1935)
  1988   – Youri Egorov, Russian pianist (b. 1954)
1989 – Jocko Conlan, American baseball player and umpire (b. 1899)
  1989   – Kaoru Ishikawa Japanese author and educator (b. 1915)
  1989   – Miles Lawrence, English cricketer (b. 1940)
1989 – Hakkı Yeten, Turkish footballer, manager and president (b. 1910) 
1991 – David Lean, English director, producer, and screenwriter (b. 1908)
1992 – Neville Brand, American actor (b. 1920)
  1992   – Alexandru Nicolschi, Romanian spy and activist (b. 1915)
  1992   – Andy Russell, American singer and actor (b. 1919)
1994 – Paul-Émilien Dalpé, Canadian labor unionist (b. 1919)
  1994   – Ralph Ellison, American novelist and critic (b. 1913)
1996 – Lucille Bremer, American actress and dancer (b. 1917) 
1997 – Esmeralda Arboleda Cadavid, Colombian politician (b. 1921)
  1997   – Roland Topor, French actor, director, and painter (b. 1938)
1998 – Alberto Calderón, Argentinian-American mathematician and academic (b. 1920)
  1998   – Fred Davis, English snooker player (b. 1913)
  1998   – Marie-Louise Meilleur, Canadian super-centenarian (b. 1880)
1999 – Skip Spence, Canadian-American singer-songwriter and guitarist (b. 1946)
2001 – Robert Osterloh, American actor (b. 1918)
  2001   – Michael Ritchie, American director, producer, and screenwriter (b. 1938)
  2001   – Alec Stock, English footballer and manager (b. 1917)
2002 – Billy Ayre, English footballer and manager (b. 1952)
  2002   – Ruth Fertel, American businesswoman, founded Ruth's Chris Steak House (b. 1927)
  2002   – Robert Urich, American actor (b. 1946)
2003 – Graham Jarvis, Canadian actor (b. 1930)
  2003   – Graham Stuart Thomas, English horticulturalist and author (b. 1909)
2005 – Kay Walsh, English actress, singer, and dancer (b. 1911)
2007 – Frank Bateson, New Zealand astronomer (b. 1909)
  2007   – Gaétan Duchesne, Canadian ice hockey player (b. 1962)
  2007   – Maria Lenk, Brazilian swimmer (b. 1915)
  2007   – Chandrabose Suthaharan, Sri Lankan journalist
2008 – Edward Norton Lorenz, American mathematician and meteorologist (b. 1917)
2010 – Rasim Delić, Bosnian general and convicted war criminal (b. 1949)
  2010   – Daryl Gates, American police officer, created the D.A.R.E. Program (b. 1926)
2011 – Gerry Alexander, Jamaican cricketer and veterinarian (b. 1928)
  2011   – Allan Blakeney, Canadian scholar and politician, tenth Premier of Saskatchewan (b. 1925)
  2011   – Sol Saks, American screenwriter and producer (b. 1910)
2012 – Sári Barabás, Hungarian soprano (b. 1914)
  2012   – Marian Biskup, Polish author and academic (b. 1922)
  2012   – Alan Hacker, English clarinet player and conductor (b. 1938)
  2012   – George Kunda, Zambian lawyer and politician, 11th Vice-President of Zambia (b. 1956)
  2012   – Mærsk Mc-Kinney Møller, Danish businessman (b. 1913)
  2012   – Carlo Petrini, Italian footballer and coach (b. 1948)
2013 – Charles Bruzon, Gibraltarian politician (b. 1938)
  2013   – Ali Kafi, Algerian politician (b. 1928)
  2013   – Siegfried Ludwig, Austrian politician, 18th Governor of Lower Austria (b. 1926)
  2013   – Pentti Lund, Finnish-Canadian ice hockey player (b. 1925)
  2013   – George Beverly Shea, Canadian-American singer-songwriter (b. 1909)
  2013   – Pat Summerall, American football player and sportscaster (b. 1930)
  2013   – Pedro Ramírez Vázquez, Mexican architect, designed the Tijuana Cultural Center and National Museum of Anthropology (b. 1919)
2014 – Gyude Bryant, Liberian businessman and politician (b. 1949)
  2014   – Aulis Rytkönen, Finnish footballer and manager (b. 1929)
  2014   – Ernst Florian Winter, Austrian-American historian and political scientist (b. 1923)
2015 – Valery Belousov, Russian ice hockey player and coach (b. 1948)
  2015   – Stanislav Gross, Czech lawyer and politician, fifth Prime Minister of the Czech Republic (b. 1969)
2018 – Harry Anderson,  American actor and magician  (b. 1952)
2021 – Andrew Peacock, Australian politician (b. 1939)
  2021   – Helen McCrory, British actress (b. 1968) 
  2021   – Liam Scarlett, British choreographer (b. 1986) 
  2021   – John Dawes, Welsh rugby union player (b. 1940)

Holidays and observances
Christian feast day:
Benedict Joseph Labre
Bernadette Soubirous
Drogo
Engratia
Fructuosus of Braga
Isabella Gilmore (Church of England)
Martyrs of Zaragoza
Molly Brant (Konwatsijayenni) (Anglican Church of Canada, Episcopal Church) 
Turibius of Astorga
April 16 (Eastern Orthodox liturgics)
Birthday of José de Diego (Puerto Rico, United States)
Birthday of Queen Margrethe II (Denmark)
Emancipation Day (Washington, D.C., United States)
Memorial Day for the Victims of the Holocaust (Hungary)
National Healthcare Decisions Day (United States)
Remembrance of Chemical Attack on Balisan and Sheikh Wasan (Iraqi Kurdistan)
World Voice Day

References

External links

 BBC: On This Day
 
 Historical Events on April 16

Days of the year
April